Jufari River is a river forming part of the border between Amazonas and Roraima states in north-western Brazil.

See also
List of rivers of Amazonas
List of rivers of Roraima

References
Brazilian Ministry of Transport

Rivers of Amazonas (Brazilian state)
Rivers of Roraima
Tributaries of the Rio Negro (Amazon)